Claude Hagège (born 1 January 1936) is a French linguist.

Biography
He was elected to the Collège de France in 1988 and received several awards for his work, including the Prix de l'Académie Française and the CNRS Gold medal. Famous for being a polyglot, he speaks (or is knowledgeable about) fifty languages, including Italian, English, Arabic, Chinese, Hebrew, Russian, Greek, Guarani, Hungarian, Navajo, Nocte, Punjabi, Persian, Malay, Hindi, Malagasy, Fula, Quechua, Tamil, Tetela, Turkish and Japanese.

Publications 
 La Langue mbum de nganha cameroun - phonologie - grammaire, Paris, Klincksieck, 1970
 Le Problème linguistique des prépositions et la solution chinoise, Paris, Société de linguistique de Paris, 1975
 La Phonologie panchronique, Paris, PUF, 1978
 Le Comox lhaamen de Colombie britannique : présentation d'une langue amérindienne. Amerindia, numéro spécial, Paris, Association d'Ethnolinguistique Amérindienne, 1981
 La Structure des langues, Paris, PUF, 1982
 L'Homme de paroles, Paris, Fayard, 1985
 L'Homme de paroles : contribution linguistique aux sciences humaines, Paris, Fayard, 1985
 Le Français et les siècles, Éditions Odile Jacob, 1987
 Le Souffle de la langue : voies et destins des parlers d'Europe, Amsterdam, John Benjamins, 1992
 The Language Builder: an Essay on the Human Signature in Linguistic Morphogenesis, 1992
 L'Enfant aux deux langues, Éditions Odile Jacob, 1996
 Le français, histoire d'un combat, Paris, Le Livre de Poche, 1996
 Halte à la mort des langues, Paris, Odile Jacob, 2001
 Combat pour le français : au nom de la diversité des langues et des cultures, Paris, Odile Jacob, 2006
 Dictionnaire amoureux des langues, Paris, Plon/Odile Jacob, 2009
 Contre la pensée unique, Paris, Odile Jacob, 2012
 Les religions, la parole, la violence, Paris, Odile Jacob, 2017.
 Le linguiste et les langues, Paris, CNRS, 2019.

Awards and honours

Awards
 1981 : Prix Volney
 1986 : Grand Prix de l'Essai de la Société des Gens de Lettres for L'Homme de paroles 
 1986 : Prix de l'Académie Française for L'Homme de paroles 
 1995 : CNRS Gold medal

National honours

References

External links

 

1936 births
Living people
Linguists from France
Linguists of Palauan
Academic staff of the Collège de France
Lycée Louis-le-Grand alumni
École Normale Supérieure alumni
Academic staff of the University of Poitiers
Chevaliers of the Légion d'honneur
Chevaliers of the Ordre des Arts et des Lettres
People from Carthage
French non-fiction writers
20th-century French non-fiction writers
21st-century French non-fiction writers
Linguists of Salishan languages
20th-century French male writers
French male non-fiction writers